The H. J. Bartenbach House is a historic house in Grand Island, Nebraska. It was built in 1937 for Henry J. Bartenbach. It was redesigned in the Streamline Moderne style by architect Gordon Shattuck in 1937–1938. For Joni Gilkerson of the Nebraska State Historical Society, "the house today stands as a notable product of the Moderne Style of architecture in Nebraska, gaining extraordinary significance as one of few recorded examples in the state and as the most important dwelling of the style in Grand Island, the home-town of architect Shattuck." It has been listed on the National Register of Historic Places since December 8, 1986.

References

		
National Register of Historic Places in Hall County, Nebraska
Moderne architecture in Nebraska
Houses completed in 1937